Russo-European Laika (Russko-Evropeĭskaya Láĭka) is the name of a breed of hunting dog that originated in the forested region of northern Europe and Russia, one of several breeds developed from landrace Laika dogs of Spitz type. The Russo-European Laika itself dates to a breeding program begun in 1944 by E. I. Shereshevsky of the  All-Union Research Institute for the Hunting Industry, in Kalinin (now Tver) Province.

Breed recognition 
The Russo-European Laika is recognized by the Fédération Cynologique Internationale in the Spitz and Primitive types/Section 2: Nordic Hunting Dogs Group. The breed is listed along with two other Russian dogs, the East Siberian Láĭka and the West Siberian Láĭka.

Breed standard 
The breed has prick ears and a sickle tail carried over the back. Temperament should be non aggressive. Colour can be any of the normal Spitz-type colours, but red and ticking on the legs is undesirable.

Temperament
The Russo-European Laika is a lively breed that enjoys time spent in the wilderness. As a natural hunter that frequently trees game, the Russo-European Laika uses its bark to alert the hunter to any treed prey (typically a raccoon or squirrel). The Russo-European Laika is also an excellent dog for duck hunting. It may often bark freely in the house as well because it is easily excited from its natural instinct. The Russo-European Laika has a strong love of humans and makes a good family dog. Once bonded to someone, it is quite territorial and makes an excellent guard dog. It is extremely tolerant of children, although not of strangers or other unfamiliar dogs.

Because of its high energy and eagerness to please, the Russo-European Laika benefits tremendously from training of any kind. Socialization should begin as a puppy and continue throughout its life. Obedience training or a working job to do will give it a sense of purpose and the frequent exercise it requires. With this proper training, it quickly and become well balanced as a family dog.

Exercise
An energetic and keen dog, the Russo-European Laika requires plenty of exercise. Any opportunities to run free and hunt are optimal. Without enough activity, it will suffer from boredom and may become destructive.

See also
 Dogs portal
 List of dog breeds
Spitz
Laika

References

External links 

Laika Breeds
The Best 8 Duck Hunting Dogs You Can Find Today

FCI breeds
Spitz breeds
Dog breeds originating in Russia
Hunting dogs
Dog breeds originating in the Soviet Union